Infraorbital is an anatomical term which means, literally, inferior to (below or beneath) the eye socket (orbit). Some examples of uses of the term are:

 Infraorbital artery
 Infraorbital foramen
 Infraorbital canal
 Infraorbital groove